Arthur Ernest Gray (10 March 1894 – 1973) was an English professional footballer who played as a winger.

References

1894 births
1973 deaths
People from Cleethorpes
English footballers
Association football wingers
Cleethorpes Town F.C. players
Grimsby Town F.C. players
English Football League players